MTS (МТС, "Mobile TeleSystems"), headquartered in Moscow, is the largest mobile network operator in Russia, operating on GSM, UMTS and LTE standards. Apart from cellular network, the company also offers local telephone service, broadband, mobile television, cable television, satellite television and digital television.

As of Q1 2021, the company serves over 84.9 million subscribers in Russia, Armenia and Belarus.

Operations

Branding
In May 2006, MTS changed their logo as a part of rebranding campaign performed by their parent company, JSFC Sistema. The logo now has two red squares next to each other. The left one, common in form (but not colour) to all JSFC Sistema's telecom subsidiaries, contains a white egg which symbolises simplicity and genius, while the right square bears the name of the company: МТС (MTS). In 2010, MTS announced acquisition of Sistema Telecom, the owners of the MTS "egg" logo, for $380 million, thus becoming the sole owner of the logo.

In 2008, the MTS brand was included in the Top 100 World's Most Powerful Brands list by Financial Times/Millward Brown ranking, becoming the most valuable Russian brand. According to this ranking, in 2010 MTS brand was 72nd most valuable brand worldwide with the brand value of $9.7 billion. In 2010 MTS also became the most valuable Russian brand according to the Interbrand ranking.

MTS Russia

In 1994, a joint venture of Moscow City Telephone Network, T-Mobile and Siemens, which later became part of Mobile TeleSystems (MTS), offered Russia's first mobile phone service for the public in Moscow. In the same year in June, VimpelCom also started Beeline mobile phone service. MTS having started in the Moscow license zone in 1994, MTS in 1997 received licenses for further areas and began expansion across Russia, later entering other countries of the CIS.

In 2009, MTS acquired several independent mobile retail chains, creating MTS monobrand retail network of 3300 stores — the second largest retail network in Russia. Also in 2009 MTS started marketing MTS-branded mobile handsets. Already in 2010 MTS became the 5th best selling handset brand in Russia, after Nokia, Samsung, LG and SonyEricsson.

In 2010, MTS announced acquisition of 62% of the stock of Comstar, the biggest Russian fixed internet and cable TV provider with 7.5 million of passed households. Comstar products were re-branded to MTS in 2010, forming the largest Russian mobile and fixed telecommunications brand. Until this purchase, MTS was presented at the fixed telephony market through its subsidiary Moscow City Telephone Network (MGTS).

In November 2013, the company has launched the "Home phone MTS" in Ryazan, Oryol, Kirov, Krasnodar, Rostov-on-Don and Yekaterinburg. The subscription fee for the wired telephone is 100 rubles. Per month, it includes unlimited calls to numbers of local fixed-line operators. The cost of calls to mobile numbers range from 1.1 rubles per minute depending on the region. Prior to that, in several cities such services are also provided by Comstar, a subsidiary of MTS.

During 2012–2013, MTS deployed FTTB network in nearly twenty new cities of the Far East, Siberia, Central, Volga and Ural federal districts. In 2012, MTS launched in all the cities where the DTV signal standard DVB-C, and in December 2013 a project to provide fixed telephony services to the mass market in the regions.

In 2013, Interregional TransitTelekom won a tender held by MTS to provide IPX services, and became one of the service providers for the company in the international telecommunications market. In November 2013 MTS began offering their Russian customers LTE roaming service, after such agreement were signed first with South Korean operator SK Telecom and then with Saudi Arabia and Great Britain. Along with the construction of the fixed network, the company launched in 2013 DVB-C digital television standard in Ulan-Ude, Blagoveshchensk, Ussuriisk and Nakhodka. In November 2013 MTS completely switched to digital TV by connecting new subscribers, ending the connection to analogue television.

On September 17, 2019, it was revealed that a storage device containing 1.7 terabytes of information related to MTS was exposed to the public internet in a data leak.

VivaCell-MTS Armenia

In Armenia, services under the MTS brand are provided by K-Telecom CJSC, under the brand name "", 80% of which are owned by MTS OJSC. The number of subscribers of VivaCell-MTS in Armenia as of 31 March 2011 was 2.55 million. As of May 2011, VivaCell-MTS occupied more than 60% of the mobile market in Armenia, and as of December 2017 VivaCell-MTS had 2.1 million subscribers.

MTS Belarus
In Belarus, the MTS trademark renders services of cellular communication and data transmission of "Mobile TeleSystems JLLC". The founders of this company are Beltelecom (51% of shares) and The Russian Mobile TeleSystems OJSC (49% of shares).

As of December 2017, MTS had 5.2 million subscribers in Belarus.

Former operations

MTS Turkmenistan
On 25 July 2012, MTS signed an agreement with the TurkmenTelecom enterprise of Ministry of Communications of Turkmenistan which says that MTS Turkmenistan will on a monthly basis pay to TurkmenTelecom 30% of its net profit derived from operations in Turkmenistan. This agreement is for five years and may be extended another five years subject to some conditions. The company has also been granted GSM and 3G licenses for a three-year term.

MTS Turkmenistan in September 2017 faced termination of the permit to use the dedicated radio frequency spectrum and some other required resources, the provision of communication services to subscribers in Turkmenistan was suspended. As of 2016, MTS-Turkmenistan had 1.7 million subscribers at its peak.

MTS Uzbekistan
Uzdunrobita was the largest mobile phone operator in Uzbekistan in the 1990s and 2000s. Uzdunrobita was founded in 1991, as a joint venture between a group of American investors, the International Communications Group, with a 45% stake; and the government of what was then the Uzbek Soviet Socialist Republic, with a 55% stake. When Uzbekistan declared independence several weeks later, the registration of the joint venture was shifted from Moscow to Tashkent, with the government stake taken over by the independent Uzbek government.

The company first turned a profit in 1993. By 1996, it had $50 million in annual revenues, 7,000 subscribers, and employed 224 staff. Gulnora Karimova gained control of the firm in the late 1990s or early 2000s, and by 2005 it was 74% owned by Russia's MTS, which paid $121 million for the stake. In 2006 it was reported to have 250,000 subscribers, ahead of Daewoo Unitel, which had 100,000, and a number of much smaller firms.

The company launched an LTE network on 2.6 GHz in July 2010, and receive a license to expand it on 700 MHz in December 2010.

Brand UMC in Uzbekistan existed until mid-2007, when major rebranding campaign occurred turning UMC into MTS. In July 2012, authorities in Uzbekistan announced the suspension of the operating license of MTS's subsidiary Uzdunrobita. Officials argued MTS-Uzbekistan has been responsible for a series of technical violations, and its operations have been suspended beginning on the evening of July 17. According to the MTS, the suspension could affect millions of Uzbek mobile phone users. An MTS statement said the firm has some 10 million clients among Uzbekistan's population of 28 million.

In August 2012, the government of Uzbekistan revoked the company's operating license and arrested several of its top management, citing repeated regulatory violations. MTS protested the action as a "shakedown", but was unable to effectively oppose it, and moved to write down its stake. At the completion of the case in September 2012, the company's assets were seized, and some of its executives sentenced to prison terms.

The Russian Foreign Ministry reacted and declared his country is concerned about the situation with Mobile TeleSystems’ Uzbekistan subsidiary Uzdunrobita, after Uzbek authorities suspended the mobile operator's license and put a senior official into custody. The dispute, which analysts fear may lead to MTS exiting the market, broke out at the beginning of 2012 when Uzbek authorities launched a near $1.3 million back-tax claim against MTS. MTS said in an e-mailed statement that the actions of the Uzbek authorities may be interpreted as “baseless attacks on the business of the Russian investor.” However, In 2019 US Department of justice charged the firm for bribery to secure contracts in Uzbekistan. MTS agreed to pay a penalty of $850 million.

MTS India
In 2008, Sistema formed 74:26 joint venture with India's Shyam Group to form Sistema Shyam Teleservices (SSTL), and acquired a pan-India licence to provide CDMA services in the country. In March 2009, SSTL launched the MTS India brand in the state of Tamil Nadu, followed by neighbouring states Kerala and West Bengal in April and May respectively. Following the cancellation of its licences by the Supreme Court of India, MTS is present in 9 circles out of 22 telecom circles of India. Media reports suggest that the Russian government was planning to buy a 20% stake in SSTL for about $700000 million.

MTS India was acquired by Reliance Communications (RCom) on 14 January 2016 in an all-stock deal, in which SSTL received a 10% share in RCom. SSTL was merged into RCom on 31 October 2017.

MTS Ukraine
On 31 October 2008, Vodafone announced a partnership deal with MTS, whereby Vodafone services will be available to MTS subscribers and both companies have noted the potential for more efficient purchasing, starting with operations in Ukraine.

In October 2015 Mobile TeleSystems and Vodafone expanded their strategic partnership; this resulted in the rebranding of MTS Ukraine to Vodafone Ukraine.

MTS sold its Ukraine operations in 2019.

See also

 Telecommunications in Russia
 Mobile phone industry in Russia

References

External links

MTS Web Site (English)
MTS Web Site (Russian)
Mobile TeleSystems OJSC (ADR) - Google Finance

 
Telecommunications companies of Russia
Telecommunications companies of Armenia
Telecommunications companies of Ukraine
Telecommunications companies of Uzbekistan
Telecommunications companies of Turkmenistan
Telecommunications companies of India
Internet service providers of Russia
Mobile phone companies of Russia
Mobile phone companies of Belarus
Mobile phone companies of Uzbekistan
Mobile phone companies of Turkmenistan
Mobile phone companies of India
Companies based in Moscow
Telecommunications companies established in 1993
1993 establishments in Russia
Companies listed on the Moscow Exchange
Companies listed on the New York Stock Exchange
Russian brands